Pierre Pousse  (born February 27, 1966) is a French former professional ice hockey player. He was a coach with the France national ice hockey team since 2004.

International
Pousse competed for France in the 1988, 1992 and 1994 Winter Olympics. He also competed in the ice Hockey World Championships for France from 1992 to 1996.

References

External links

1966 births
Diables Rouges de Briançon players
French expatriate sportspeople in Canada
French expatriate ice hockey people
French ice hockey right wingers
Gothiques d'Amiens players
Living people
Ice hockey players at the 1992 Winter Olympics
Ice hockey players at the 1994 Winter Olympics
Olympic ice hockey players of France
Saint-Jean Castors players
Sportspeople from Strasbourg